Olivia Shannon (born 23 May 2001) is a field hockey player from New Zealand.

Early life and education
Shannon grew up on a farm in rural Manawatu, New Zealand. She played rugby until age 12. She began playing field hockey at age 11.

Field hockey career 
Shannon plays the position of striker in field hockey. Shannon began playing for Central's under-18 team at age 14. In 2018, Shannon played for Central in the New Zealand national under 18 tournament. She was top goal scorer of the tournament and her performance led to her being named player of the tournament and helped her team defend the championship. She also led her school, Havelock North's Iona College, to a national secondary school field hockey title. Her performance for the school led to Shannon being named Central Hockey U18 Women's Player of the Year for 2018. In late 2018, Shannon was named to the Black Sticks, New Zealand's national women's field hockey team. Shannon was the youngest player named to the team's 2019 line-up.

References 

2001 births
Living people
People from Manawatū-Whanganui
People educated at Iona College, Havelock North
New Zealand female field hockey players
Field hockey players at the 2020 Summer Olympics
Olympic field hockey players of New Zealand
Field hockey players at the 2022 Commonwealth Games